Fallin' for You for Years is the fifty-first studio album by American country music singer Conway Twitty. The album was released in 1986 by Warner Bros. Records. The album was his last for the label, and also contained his 35th and final #1 country hit, "Desperado Love".

Track listing

Charts

References

1986 albums
Conway Twitty albums
Warner Records albums